Knayton is a small village in Hambleton District of North Yorkshire, England. It is located north of Thirsk just off the A19. It is linked with the hamlet of Brawith, approximately 1 mile away. The Dog and Gun public house faces the village green and the village hall. There is also a caravan park and bus stop but no scheduled service. Knayton is also the home of The Hillside Rural Activities Park (HRAP) with a cricket pitch, 3 tennis courts, 2 football pitches and is the permanent home of Borrowby show. In 2012 The Willowman Festival was held on the park.

Knayton forms part of the civil parish of Knayton with Brawith.

External links

Knayton Website
Hillside Rural Activities Park

Villages in North Yorkshire